The Kensico Reservoir is a reservoir spanning the towns of Armonk (North Castle) and Valhalla (Mount Pleasant), New York, located 3 miles (5 km) north of White Plains. It was formed by the original earth and gravel Kensico Dam constructed in 1885, which impounded waters from the Bronx and Byram rivers. In 1917, a new masonry dam was completed, replacing the old dam and expanding the water supply by bringing water from the Catskill Mountains over a distance of more than 100 miles. 

The reservoir mainly serves to store waters received from the Catskill Mountains west of the Hudson River. Along with the West Branch Reservoir and Boyds Corner Reservoir, it is one of four reservoirs within the Catskill/Delaware system outside the Catskill Mountains region. The other reservoir is the Hillview Reservoir.

The Kensico Reservoir also hosts fishing and boating recreation. Every year, the reservoir is stocked with over 2,000 brown trout.

History
As the population of New York City grew in the 19th century, so did the need for water. The first use of water from Westchester County came from the old Croton Dam (forming what was called Croton Lake), which was completed in 1842. In the 1880s, the City faced increasing demands for water and sought to enlarge the Croton Reservoir to meet that need. The enlargement of the Croton Reservoir (with the construction of the New Croton Dam and the forming of the New Croton Reservoir) was completed in 1906 as a part of a system of reservoirs designed to bring water from Putnam and Westchester Counties (the Croton Watershed) to New York City.

The village of Kensico, New York, was named in 1849 for a Siwanoy Indian chief, Cokenseko, who had sold most of the land surrounding White Plains to English settlers in the 1600s. In 1885, the old Kensico Dam was built south of the village of Kensico, NY as an additional source of water for New York City. The earth and gravel dam formed a small lake from water supplied by the Bronx River and the Byram River, but it was still not enough for the ever-increasing population of New York City. A reservoir was needed that would contain waters from various new reservoirs and act as a holding tank for distribution to New York City.

Kensico was surrounded by hills that came to a natural V-shape, making it an ideal area to hold a vast amount of water. To the south of Kensico was Rye Pond and Little Rye Pond in Harrison, New York, which would eventually form part of the new reservoir.  A nearby quarry in Harrison bordering Cranberry Lake, provided the necessary materials for building the new dam. Although Kensico had a population of approximately 200, it was home to churches, hotels and a railroad station.

In 1905, legislation was passed by New York State to allow money to be raised for the building of the Kensico Reservoir. The next year, final planning by the state was approved, and preliminary surveys were started. A seventeen mile railroad spur and small network of highways were privately built to carry materials from quarries at nearby Cranberry and Silver Lakes to the dam site. A camp for the workers and their families was also constructed, along with facilities such as schools for their children.

To prepare for the dam construction, each individual lot of land was condemned and appraised, and the owner was paid a "fair value" for the land. Many of the families had to move to such surrounding communities as Armonk, Harrison, Valhalla, and White Plains. The village of Kensico was then flooded to make way for the reservoir.

After the September 11 attacks, the road spanning the top of the Kensico Dam was closed to all traffic for fear of an attempt to destroy the dam. On September 11, 2005, a 9/11 memorial was dedicated in the dam plaza to the 111 Westchester County residents who died in the attack. In May 2012, the roadway was reopened to pedestrian and bicycle traffic.

On July 12, 2018, the New York City Department of Environmental Protection (DEP) press office announced plans for a Kensico-Eastview Connection Project.  The project mainly involves constructing an approximately 2 mile long tunnel between the Kensico Reservoir and the nearby Catskill/Delaware Ultraviolet Light Disinfection (CDUV) Facility.

Dam construction

Before constructing the existing Kensico Dam, the old Kensico Dam had to be removed; this began in 1911. The construction of the new dam began in 1913 and was concluded in 1917—three years ahead of schedule—at a cost of more than $15,000,000. It contains  of masonry—as much masonry as the Egyptians used to build some of the pyramids. In one month, 2.5 million cubic yards of concrete were placed into block-shaped forms, which had to cure for three months before being swung onto the rising hyperbolic pile of dam. 

New York City’s main contractor built a work camp at nearby Valhalla for the 1,500 men who worked on the dam at the height of construction. The water supply board created a mounted police force to keep order. This entailed months of blasting and a number of fatal accidents. As the aqueduct neared completion in 1913, the work gangs at Kensico began laying the first of the concrete bricks of which the dam is built.

The tremendous influx of workers and their families provided a period of prosperity for the surrounding area, spurring new stores, rooming houses, hotels, restaurants and saloons.  Many of the construction families remained in the area after completion of the dam, contributing to the growth and character of Valhalla and its environs. The Kensico Reservoir was acquired as parkland in 1963 from the New York City Watershed Commission and remains the property of the DEP.  Kensico Dam Plaza is a Westchester County Park.

Water sources

The reservoir is the collecting point for the water from all six reservoirs in the Catskill Mountains: the Ashokan Reservoir, the Cannonsville Reservoir, the Neversink Reservoir, the Pepacton Reservoir, the Rondout Reservoir, and the Schoharie Reservoir. It also receives water from the Boyds Corner Reservoir and the West Branch Reservoir through the Delaware aqueduct. Water freely flows between Kensico Reservoir and Rye Lake. Through the use of pumping stations along the Delaware Aqueduct, it is possible to supply Kensico reservoir with water from the Cross River Reservoir and Croton Falls Reservoir (and indirectly, the reservoirs upstream of Croton Falls) as well as the Hudson River, however these connections are normally not in use. 

The resulting body of water has a drainage basin of only , yet holds  of water at full capacity. The reservoir's watershed provides only 2% of NYC's water supply; the rest of the water comes from the reservoirs to which it connects. The water in the reservoir either provides New York City and Westchester County with water, or it travels down the spillway east of the main Kensico Dam, and continues down the rest of the Bronx River, eventually flowing to the East River.

There are two outlets which provide water to parts of Westchester County. The water supplying New York City travels down either the Catskill Aqueduct or the Delaware Aqueduct. After leaving Kensico, the water is treated with ultraviolet light at the New York City Department of Environmental Protection's Eastview facility, then continues on to Hillview Reservoir. At Hillview the water enters the three city tunnels which distribute water throughout the boroughs of New York City. Since the opening of the Eastview UV facility the Catskill Aqueduct between Kensico Reservoir and Eastview has been out of service. There is a new tunnel being built replacing the aqueduct on this section, and until its completion, all water must travel via the Delaware Aqueduct between these two points.

Dam restoration

In 2005, the DEP commenced a $31.4 million project to restore the Kensico Dam. The rehabilitation project consisted of reconstructing the colonnades at the ends of the dam; cleaning and repairing all stone masonry surfaces on the dam; reconstructing the lower pavilions; reconstructing the dam’s downstream terrace; reconstructing the spillway and spillway channel; cleaning the spillway discharge pipe; cleaning the internal galleries; installing new lighting and doors; reconstructing the Upper Gate Chamber, Lower Valve Chamber and Maintenance House; and performing grading and landscaping.

Fishing
Kensico Reservoir sustains an active population of gamefish, supplemented by stocking, including brown trout, lake trout, smallmouth bass, largemouth bass, perch, and grass pickerel. The size and depth of the reservoir allow lake trout in particular to thrive. Shore fishing is practiced in many areas, and boating is restricted to Department of Environmental Conservation licensed and inspected aluminum rowboats. No motor-boats are permitted on the reservoir, nor are recreational watercraft such as kayaks, rafts, or canoes.

In April 2020, the reservoir was stocked with 7,360 brown trout fingerlings. The reservoir was formerly stocked with lake trout, however, this program was discontinued after it was determined they had established a sustainable breeding population.

Kensico Dam Plaza
The Kensico Dam plaza is a plaza located at the foot of the dam. Modern use of the plaza is as a public park. Historically, Westchester County's Department of Parks has hosted  several community-wide events, including outdoor screenings throughout the summer and early autumn, and a Fourth of July celebration with fireworks, food trucks, and live music. Amid the COVID-19 pandemic, it also sponsored "Winter Wonderland," a winter-holiday-themed drive-through light experience. 

The plaza also provides opportunities for recreational activities, including a playground, large lawn, gravel paths for walking and biking, and a hiking trail running from the plaza-level to the top of the dam. Placards posted throughout the plaza encompass its history. 

In 2014, an electrical system upgrade added permanent park lighting, allowing the plaza to remain open after dark.

The plaza is also home to The Rising, a memorial dedicated to victims of the 9/11 terrorist attacks who were from Westchester County. This memorial displays the names of the victims on the granite surrounding the main structure. The main structure of the memorial is made of steel rods that come together and point to the sky. Visitors can interact with the memorial by going inside the structure. The Rising is where the annual 9/11 commemoration takes place at Kensico Dam plaza, a ceremony honoring the Westchester residents who lost their lives that day.

See also 
 Trial of Joseph Spell

References

External links 

 Westchester County official website for Kensico Dam Plaza
 Short film (1920s) containing views of the Kensico Dam
Photos and history of the Kensico Dam

Reservoirs in Westchester County, New York
Reservoirs in New York (state)
Catskill/Delaware watersheds
Dams in New York (state)
Protected areas of Westchester County, New York
Mount Pleasant, New York
1885 establishments in New York (state)